The Anaconda Range, informally known as the "Pintlers", is a group of high mountains located in southwestern Montana, in the northwestern United States. The mountain range takes its name from the nearby town of  Anaconda, founded by Marcus Daly in 1883. To the northwest are the Sapphire Mountains, to the south is the Big Hole Valley. Due north, the range blends into the Flint Creek Range, and to the southeast lies the Big Hole River and Pioneer Mountains. Other major summits include Mt. Evans, Mt. Haggin, Warren Peak, and East Goat Peak. Much of the range is protected in the Anaconda-Pintler Wilderness Area.

See also
 List of mountain ranges in Montana

References

External links
Gorp Away

Summitpost.org

Mountain ranges of Montana
Landforms of Ravalli County, Montana
Landforms of Granite County, Montana
Landforms of Beaverhead County, Montana
Landforms of Deer Lodge County, Montana